Jawad (Arabic & Persian: جواد), ; ; , ;) is an Arabic given name that means generous, liberal, magnanimous, merciful, and open-handed. The name is common in the Balkans, Caucasus, Middle East, Morocco and South Asia.

First name

Jaouad Achab (born 1992), Belgian taekwondo practitioner of Moroccan origin
Jawad Ahmad (born 1970), Pakistani singer and politician
Jaouad Akaddar (1984–2012), Moroccan footballer
Jawad Akeel (born 1978), Dutch-Qatari footballer
Jawad Ali (1907–1987), Iraqi historian
Javad Alizadeh (born 1953), Iranian cartoonist
Javad Allahverdi (born 1954), Iranian footballer
Jawad Anani (born 1943), Jordanian economist and politician
Jawad El Andaloussi, Moroccan footballer 
Jawad Al Arrayed (born 1940), Bahraini politician
Jawad al-Assadi (born 1947), Iraqi theatre director and playwright
Jawad Bashir, Pakistani director, actor and singer
Jawad Blunt (born 1995), Pakistani freestyle football champion
Jawad Botmeh, Palestinian student convicted of the 1994 attack in the London Israeli embassy
Jawad al-Bulani (born 1960), Iraqi politician and minister
Jaouad Chiguer (born 1985), French amateur boxer
Cevat Cobanli (1870-1938), Turkish commander and politician
Jawad Rumi Daini (born 1948), Iraqi Army general
Javad Davari (born 1983), Iranian basketball player
Jawad Dawood (born 1982), Pakistani-Canadian cricketer 
Javad Fakoori (1938–1981), Iranian Air Force officer
Javad Gharavi Aliari (born 1935), Iranian Grand Ayatollah
Jaouad Gharib (born 1972), Moroccan runner
Jawad Ghaziyar, Afghan singer
Cevat Güler (born 1959), Turkish footballer and coach
Cevat Abbas Gurer (1887–1943), Turkish officer and politician
Jawad El Hajri (born 1979), French footballer
Javad Hakimli (1914–2016), Soviet Azerbaijani Partisan during WWII
Jawad Hameed (born 1976), Pakistani cricketer
Javad Hamidi (born 1918), Iranian painter and poet
Javad Hashemi (born 1966), Iranian actor and director
Javad Heyat (1925-2014), Iranian Azerbaijani surgeon and Writer
Jawad Hussain (1939–2008), Indian cricketer
Cevat Şakir Kabaağaçlı (1886–1973), Turkish writer
Jawad Kadhim (born 1993), Iraqi footballer
Dževad Karahasan (born 1953), Bosnian writer and philosopher
Javad Kazemian (born 1981), Iranian footballer
Xhevat Kelmendi (born 1955), Kosovar singer
Javad Khan (died 1804), member of the royal Qajar family
Cevat Kula (1902–1977), Turkish equestrian
Javad Malik-Yeganov (1878–1942), Azerbaijani politician and Governor-General of Lankaran
Javad Maroufi (1912–1993), Iranian composer and pianist
Javad Mojabi (born 1939), Iranian poet and literary critic
Javad Nekounam (born 1980), Iranian footballer
Javad Nurbakhsh (1926–2008), Iranian Sufi leader and psychiatrist
Jawad Ouaddouch (born 1981), Moroccan footballer
Dževad Prekazi (born 1957), Yugoslav Kosovar footballer
Dževad Poturak (born 1977), Bosnian super heavyweight kickboxer
Javad Razavian, Iranian actor
Javad Razzaghi (born 1982), Iranian footballer
Jawad Jabbar Sadkhan Al-Sahlani, Iraqi man held at Guantanamo 
Jawad Saleem (1919–1961), Iraqi painter and sculptor
Jawad Salehi (born 1956), Iranian electrical and computer engineer
Dževad Šećerbegović (born 1955), Yugoslav Bosnian footballer
Cevat Seyit (1906-1945), Turkish footballer
Javad Shamaqdari (born 1960), Iranian filmmaker and politician 
Javad Khan Shiravanski (1809-1882), Major General of the Russian Imperial Army and Azerbaijani Noble
Javad Shirzad (born 1982), Iranian footballer
Javad Tabatabai (born 1945), Iranian political philosopher and historian
Jawad Tabrizi (1926–2006), Iranian Ayatollah
Dževad Turković (born 1972), Yugoslav and Croatian footballer
Jawad Williams (born 1983), American basketball player 
Javad Yasari (born 1947), Persian singer
Cevat Yerli (born 1978), Turkish and German computer game developer
Jaouad Zairi (born 1982), Moroccan footballer 
Javad Zarincheh (born 1966), Iranian football player and coach

Middle name

Mohammad-Javad Bahonar (1933–1981), Iranian theologian and politician
Mohammad Jawad Balaghi (1865–1933), Iraqi Shia Muslim religious authority
Migjen Xhevat Basha (born 1987), Kosovar Albanian footballer
Mohamad Jawad Chirri (1905–1994), Lebanese founder of the Islamic Center of America
Mufid Mohammad Jawad al-Jazairi (born 1939), Iraqi journalist and politician 
Mohamad Jawad Khalifeh, Lebanese politician and minister of health
Mohammad-Javad Larijani (born 1951), Iranian politician, hard-line cleric and mathematician
Zayn Javadd Malik (born 1993), Pakistani-English singer and songwriter
Syed Jawad Naqvi (born 1952), Pakistani Twelver Shia Muslim cleric
Hossam Jawad Al-Sabah (born 1948), Lebanese actor
Ali Jawad al-Sheikh (1997–2011), Bahraini boy killed in the Bahraini Uprising
Ali Jawad Al Taher (c. 1911–1996), Iraqi literary scholar and critic
Ridha Jawad Taqi, Iraqi politician and Member of Parliament
Leman Cevat Tomsu (1913-1988), Turkish architect and academic 
Mohammad Javad Tondguyan (1950–1991), Iranian engineer and politician 
Abu Mohammad Jawad Walieddine (1916–2012), Lebanese regional Druze spiritual leader
Ali Jawad Zaidi (1916–2004), Indian Urdu poet and scholar
Mohammad Javad Zarif (born 1960), Iranian diplomat, academic, and foreign minister

Last name

Abdul Sattar Jawad (born 1943), Iraqi-American scholar of Arabic and English literature 
Ahmad Javad (1892–1937), Azerbaijani poet
Ali Jawad (born 1989), British paralympic powerlifter
Daniane Jawad (born 1986), Moroccan footballer
Hussain Jawad (born 1987), Bahraini human rights activist
Kalbe Jawad, Indian Muslim cleric and scholar
Kashif Jawad (born 1981), Pakistani field hockey player
Mazen Abdul-Jawad (born 1977), Saudi Arabian man arrested for talking publicly about sex
Mohamed Abd Al-Jawad (born 1962), Saudi Arabian footballer 
Mohammed Abdel-Jawad (born 1979), Palestinian footballer
Mohamed Jawad (born 1985), Pakistani youth accused and held for attempted murder at Guantanamo
Muhammad al-Jawad, (811–835), ninth of the Twelve Imams
Said Tayeb Jawad (born 1958), Afghan diplomat
Saleh Abd al-Jawad (born 1952), Palestinian historian
Shamim Jawad, Afghan activist
Shireen Jawad (born 1971), Bangladeshi-English singer
Sophia Jawad (born 1986), Iraqi actress and model

See also
Jawad (disambiguation), for non-name uses

References